Jean-François Breau (born 29 July 1978 in Hamilton, Ontario, Canada) is a Canadian singer-songwriter of Acadian origin.

Biography
Born in Hamilton, Ontario of an Acadian father from Tracadie–Sheila and a mother from Matane, Breau grew up in Tracadie–Sheila, on the Acadian Peninsula, in the Gloucester county of New Brunswick. He presently resides in Quebec.

After finishing his secondary education, Jean-Francois studied medicine. He was a health major at University of Moncton's Shippagan Campus to become a cardiologist.

In 2004, he took over the lead role in another musical comedy Don Juan of Félix Gray. His role was opposite the lead role of Marie-Ève Janvier. The show had 350 presentations in Canada, France and South Korea, and the album from the show featuring songs by Breau sold 350,000 worldwide.

Breau launched his first solo album in 2001 the self-titled Jean-François Breau on Quartett Music, followed by a second solo album Exposé in 2006 with ICI Musique.

In 2008, he toured Quebec with Marie-Ève Janvier, his girlfriend. In the summer of 2009, they recorded their first joint album entitled , followed by a second joint album  released on 19 September 2011. The joint single "", a cover of a 1973 Johnny Hallyday and Sylvie Vartan song, became a big hit for them.

They both took part in a revival of Don Juan in February 2012 where Breau played the role of Don Juan opposite Janvier in the role of Maria. This was followed by joint promotional tour called  in Quebec in Spring 2012.

In popular culture
Jean-François Breau, in collaboration with Marc Dupré wrote the song "" for Marie-Ève Janvier.
He also wrote the music for the song "" with lyrics by Françoise Dorin for Céline Dion, which she included in her album .
In 2010, Breau was part of the  French Canadian charity for aid for Haiti earthquake victims and performed in the charity concert and telethon organized.
 He has composed the music for the song "" with lyrics by Frederick Baron and Marie-Jo Zarb for the Greek singer George Perris which was included in his album .

Discography

Albums
Solo
2001:  (Quartett Music)
2006:  (ICI Musique)
Marie-Ève Janvier and Jean-François Breau
2009: 
2011: 
2013: 
2014: 
Featured in
2003: Don Juan (Guy Cloutier Communications)
2004: Don Juan (L'intégrale) (Guy Cloutier Communications)

Singles
As duo Marie-Ève Janvier and Jean-François Breau
2011: "" 
2011: ""
2012: ""

Appearances
 1997:  in Petite-Vallée
 1998:  in Caraquet
 1998:  in Saint-Ambroise
 1998:  in Granby

Awards
 "Personality of the Year in New Brunswick" - awarded by the New Brunswick francophones media outlets
 2002: "Album of the Year" at Gala des Éloizes in Moncton, New Brunswick
 2002: "Spectacle show of the year" at the same Gala
 2002: Nomination for "Revelation of the Year" at Gala of ADISQ
 2002: Nomination for "Francophone Album of the Year" at the East Coast Music Award
 2005: "Prix Éloizes" in Moncton

Joint Marie-Ève Janvier / Jean-François Breau

References

External links
 Jean-François Breau Official site
 Marie-Ève Janvier et Jean-François Breau Joint Official site

1978 births
Franco-Ontarian people
Living people
Musicians from Hamilton, Ontario
French-language singers of Canada
21st-century Canadian male singers